Harry Sniderman was a sports figure in Toronto, Canada, who was later known as an promoter, organizer and businessman.

In 1936 the Olympics were held in Berlin, the capital of Nazi Germany, so Sniderman and several other athletes who objected to attending an event in Nazi Germany attended an alternate Olympics in Barcelona.

Sniderman was survived by his wife, Molly, who died in 2009.

References

Year of birth missing
Place of birth missing
Year of death missing
Place of death missing
Sportspeople from Toronto